The Catalonia men's national pitch and putt team represents Catalonia in the pitch and putt international competitions. It is managed by the Catalan Federation of Pitch and putt (FCPP).

Pitch and putt is played in Catalonia since the "eighties" when Martin Withelaw build a course in Solius (Girona). The interest on Pitch and putt has been growing since then, with more than 10000 players in 2004.

In 1999 the "Associació Catalana de Pitch and putt" was one of the founders of the European Pitch and Putt Association, the governing body that develops the pitch and putt in Europe and stages the European Team Championship. Catalonia has won once the European Championship (2010).

In 2006 the "Federació Catalana de Pitch and putt" participated in the establishment of the Federation International of Pitch and Putt Associations (FIPPA), that stages the World Cup Team Championship. Catalonia has won 2 World Cups, in 2004 and 2006.

National team

Players
Team in the European Championship 2010
Enric Sanz
Paco Salido
Fernando Cano
Jordi Saborit
Dani Gimenez
Daniel Coleman

Team in the World Cup 2008
Fernando Cano
Salvador Garangou
Daniel Giménez

Team in the European Championship 2007
Marc Lloret
Joan Poch
Fernando Cano
Jordi Serra
David Solé
Daniel Coleman

See also
World Cup Team Championship
European Team Championship

External links
FCPP Catalan Federation of Pitch and Putt
FIPPA Federation of International Pitch and Putt Associations website
EPPA European Pitch and Putt Association website
ORFEO CATALONIA Pitch & Putt Team

National pitch and putt teams
Pitch and putt